The Târgu Mureș gas field natural gas field is located near Târgu Mureș in Mureș County. It was discovered in 1920 and developed by Romgaz. It began production in 1925 and produces natural gas and condensates. The total proven reserves of the Târgu Mureș gas field are around 697 billion cubic feet (20 km³), and production is slated to be around 55 million cubic feet/day (1.55×105m³) in 2010.

References

Târgu Mureș
Natural gas fields in Romania